Giv'ati is a moshav in southern Israel. Located near Ashdod, it falls under the jurisdiction of Be'er Tuvia Regional Council.

History
The moshav was founded by IDF veterans and Jewish refugees from Egypt on the ruins of the Palestinian Arab village of Bayt Daras, and was named after the Giv'ati Brigade of the IDF, which stopped the Egyptian Army from entering Israel from the south in the 1948 Arab–Israeli War.

Economy
Pashut Yarok ("Simply Green") is a Giv'ati-based company that has developed and manufactures Shock Pad, a shock-absorbing, water- and fireproof material uniquely produced from discarded polyethylene, currently used in playgrounds and with the potential of being used as insulation in house construction.

References

Moshavim
Populated places established in 1950
Populated places in Southern District (Israel)
1950 establishments in Israel
Egyptian-Jewish culture in Israel